Charlton is a hamlet in the Chichester district of West Sussex, England. It lies on the Singleton to East Dean road 5.3 miles (8.6 km) north of Chichester. At the 2011 Census the population of the hamlet was included in the civil parish of Bosham.

References

External links

Villages in West Sussex